The Bridgeport Depot Museum, sometimes called the Bridgeport Depot in Bridgeport, Alabama is home to railroad memorabilia as well as a range of local artifacts. Items in the museum's collection date back to 1807 with Bridgeport News issues going back to 1891, post office and tax records as well as items related to Bridgeport's role in the American Civil War. The museum, operated by the Bridgeport Area Historical Association, is located on the site of the town's fourth railroad depot, which was constructed in 1917.

See also
List of Civil War Discovery Trail sites

References

External links

Official site

Museums in Jackson County, Alabama
American Civil War museums in Alabama
Former railway stations in Alabama